Acorethra is a genus of beetles in the family Cerambycidae, containing the following species:

 Acorethra aureofasciata Gounelle, 1911
 Acorethra erato (Newman, 1840)

References

Rhinotragini